Juanito "Johnny" Reyes Remulla Sr. (April 14, 1933 – December 29, 2014) was a Filipino lawyer and politician who served as the longest sitting governor of Cavite.

Early life
Remulla was born on April 14, 1933 in Toclong, Imus, Cavite to Crispin and Teofista (née Reyes) Remulla. He was a valedictorian in the Medicion Elementary School in Imus and first honorable mention in the high school department of the Francisco Law College. He landed fourth in the 1956 Bar examinations after graduating from the College of Law in the University of the Philippines. While there, he was a member of Upsilon Sigma Phi.

Legal career
Remulla was a lawyer and a business executive before he entered the government service. He was the senior partner in the Remulla, Estrella & Associates Law Office and the chairman of the board of Covelandia Island Resort in Binakayan in Kawit, Cavite at the same time. Owing to his brilliant scholastic record, Remulla was chosen awardee of the Colombo Plan Scholarship, Institute of Local Government, in Birmingham, England (1966–67).

Political life

Acting Governor and delegate to the 1971 Constitutional Convention
He was appointed as acting governor in 1964 and 1965. His two brief stints in the executive office must have so impressed the Caviteños that in the election of delegates to the 1971 Constitutional Convention Remulla, 38, the youngest candidate, garnered the highest number of votes, besting his three more senior and experiences colleagues. Remulla was already a member of the provincial board and elected to the provincial board in 1972, he became vice governor the same year.

Governor of Cavite
Two months after the death of Dominador Camerino on July 24, 1979, he holds the distinction of being the last appointed governor of Cavite on September 25. Finally, in the election for governor on January 30, 1980, Remulla, the KBL candidate, obtained an overwhelming majority over his Nacionalista opponent, Fernando Campos. As a Marcos ally, he is the one of the local government executives forced to resign during the early days of Corazon Aquino administration. In 1988, he was re-elected as Governor until 1995, when he was defeated by outgoing NBI director Epimaco Velasco.

Personal life
He married Ditas Catibayan and had seven children including Jesus Crispin, the incumbent Secretary of Justice, Gilbert, a former representative, and Jonvic, the incumbent governor of Cavite.

Death
He died on December 29, 2014, aged 81, from multiple organ failure.

References

1933 births
2014 deaths
People from Imus
Governors of Cavite
Members of the Cavite Provincial Board
20th-century Filipino lawyers
University of the Philippines Diliman alumni